The Shephelah or Shfela, lit. The different use of the term "Judean Plain", as either defining just the Coastal Plain segment stretching along the Judaean Mountains, or also including, or only referring to, the Shfela, often creates grave confusion.

Today the Shfela is largely rural with many farms, but the cities of Ashdod, Ashkelon, Rehovot, Beit Shemesh, and Kiryat Gat roughly surround it.

The Bible assigned land in the Shfela to the tribes of Judah and Dan.

Biblical references
The Shfela is mentioned many times in the Hebrew Bible. (In the King James Version, the Hebrew term "Shfela" tends to be translated as "vale" or "valley.") The Shfela was the site of many biblical battles. During the Bar Kokhba revolt, hollowed out hills were connected to form elaborate bunker systems for the combat with the Romans.

Geography

The Shfela consists of fertile rolling hills. Topographically, it represents the transition from the higher and more rugged Jerusalem and Hebron Mountains, whose foothills it forms, and the Coastal Plain. About 60 km (35 miles) long in north-south direction and only 13 km (8 miles) wide, it is subdivided into two parts: the western "Low Shephelah", which starts at an altitude of ca. 150 metres above sea level and rises to no more than ca. 200 metres above the Coastal Plain, and the eastern "High Shephelah" rising to altitudes between 250–450 metres above sea level. In the upper part the valleys descending from the Judean Mountains are deeper, and they broaden once they reach the lower part where the riverbeds create larger spaces between the hills. Where they reach the Shfela, the rivers can flow over substantial distances along the border between the mountains and the hills, forming longitudinal valleys. Passage between the east-west and north-south valleys has dictated the communication routes throughout history.

In geological terms, the Shfela is a syncline, i.e. it formed as a basin whose rock layers were folded downwards, but is part of the wider south Judean anticlinorium-a regional formation characterised by upward folding. Typical to the Shfela are the Senonian-Eocene chalky formations. The soft Eocene chalk is known locally as kirton, which tends to build a harder upper calcrete crust (nari), so that in the past people quarried the kirton while leaving the nari layer in place as a ceiling. Apart from using the extracted rock, they also utilised the generated underground hollows for different purposes (refuge, burial, storage etc.).

One of the major characteristics is hills formed of marl-covered soft chalk, as opposed to the Judean Hills which are made of hard chalk and dolomite. The valleys and lower areas contain soil with a high sand content, as well as large tracts of fertile areas. Seasonal swamps can develop during the rainy season. The southern part is made up of loess, while north of Ashkelon consists of clay.

The Shfela has a temperate Mediterranean to semi-arid climate.

A series of east-west valleys cuts the Shfelah into districts. From north to south, they are: the Valley of Ayalon, Sorek Valley, Valley of Elah, Guvrin Valley, Valley of Lachish, and Valley of Adorayim. The biblical towns established there guarded settlements of the interior and took advantage of trade passing along this route. Ayalon was the primary access corridor to Jerusalem along the ascent of Horon.

Caves are a major feature of the southern part of the Shfela, many of them bell-shaped such as those in Beit Guvrin.

History and archaeology
Archaeological surveys in the Shephelah have found evidence of habitation during the Late Bronze period. During the early Iron Age, the population of what has been widely believed to be a Canaanite enclave between the rising centres of both coastal Philistia and the Israelite/Judahite highlands, went into decline, though a string of settlements survived on the eastern edge. In the Iron Age IIA–B, population growth resumed and by the 8th century BCE it was densely populated, not so much by natural growth but as a result of incoming settlers, beginning with the short-lived settlement at Khirbet Qeiyafa. The overall estimated numbers for inhabitants  range from  50,000 to 100,000, over numerous sites such as Tel Lachish,  Azekah,  Tel Burna, Tel Zayit, Khirbet el-Qom,  Tel Erani, Tel Harasim and Tel Nagila. This colonization, together with the inhabitants of the Canaanite enclave, identified with the highland Israelite/Judahite culture, and its expansion coincides with the decline of Philistia. During the decline and ultimate destruction of Judah by the Neo-Assyrian Empire and the Neo-Babylonian Empire, the region was taken over gradually by the Edomites and it became the core of what was known in Greek as Idumea. The Shephela flourished during the Hellenistic period, was strongly affected by the First Jewish-Roman War (66–70) and was largely depopulated of Jews as a result of the Bar Kokhba revolt (132–136). It flourished again in the Byzantine period and was the scene of one of the major battles during the Muslim conquest of the Levant of the 7th century.

Archaeological sites 

 Azekah
 Tel Batash
 Beit Guvrin
 Beit Jimal
 Tell Beit Mirsim
 Beit Shemesh
 Tel Burna
 Tel Eton
 Gezer
 Imwas and Emmaus Nicopolis
 Tel Halif
 Hurvat Itri
 Jarmuth
 Tell ej-Judeideh
 Kharruba
 Keilah
 Tel Lachish
 Lavnin
 Khirbet Qeiyafa
 Khirbet a-Ra'i
 Sokho

 Tell Zayit
 Zorah

See also
Geography of Israel
Kiryat Gat – modern Israeli town
Latrun – historical site and modern monastery in the Ayalon Valley
Modi'in-Maccabim-Re'ut – modern Israeli town

References

External links

 Soils of the Coastal Plain and the Shefela

Hebrew Bible places
Regions of Israel